Upper Arag (Old Arag), also known as Juhuro-Arag is an abandoned Lezgin aul in the Suleyman-Stalsky District of Dagestan.

Geography
The village is located in the foothills of the Suleiman Stalsky district.

History
Juhuro-Arag is an ancestral village of the Aragar clan.

In the 17th-19th centuries, the Mountain Jews population of Dagestan was concentrated in mountain settlements.

The Mountain Jews villages of the foothill zone were usually located in fertile gorges along the roads that connected the highlands with the plains. As a rule, the inhabitants were engaged in agriculture, crafts, and trade. Trade with some of the gorges was almost entirely in the hands of the Mountain Jews. The inhabitants supplied almost all villages of the Kurakhsky  Gorge and Upper Tabasaransky with goods.

In the first half of the 20th century Arag’s Mountain Jews gradually moved to Derbent. By the end of the 1950s, no Mountain Jews were left in either the Kurakhsky or Tabasaransky villages. The cemeteries have been preserved.

References

Citations

Former places
Former villages
Former populated places
Rural localities in Suleyman-Stalsky District
Abolished settlements of Suleiman-Stalsky district